Gwadabawa is a Local Government Area in Sokoto State, Nigeria. Its headquarters are in the town of Gwadabawa on the A1 highway.  It comprises Gwadabawa, Salame, Chimola
and Asara districts

It has an area of 991 km and a population of 231,358 at the 2006 census.

The postal code of the area is 843.

References

Local Government Areas in Sokoto State